Issoca is a genus of land planarians from Brazil.

Description 
Species of the genus Issoca are characterized by the presence of a spoon-shaped head having a cephalic retractor muscle, which allows those animals to pull their anterior end upwards and backwards. Associated to the muscle are cephalic glands, forming a so-called cephalic musculo-glandular organ in a way similar to the one found in the genera Choeradoplana and Luteostriata. The copulatory apparatus usually lacks a permanent penis papilla, i. e., the penis is formed during copulation by folds in the male cavity which are pushed outwards.

Etymology 
The name Issoca comes from Tupi içoca (worm, maggot).

Species 
There are five described species in the genus Issoca:
Issoca assanga Araujo & Carbayo, 2018
Issoca jandaia Froehlich, 1955
Issoca piranga Froehlich, 1955
Issoca potyra Froehlich, 1957
Issoca rezendei (Schirch, 1929)
Issoca spatulata (Graff, 1899)

References 

Geoplanidae
Rhabditophora genera